is a 2011 Japanese cheerleading film directed by Shō Tsukikawa.

The movie served as Universal Music Japan's second movie in the Japanese movie market, following the success of its first offering, the action film "Run 60".

Cast
 You Kikkawa 
 Akari Hayami 
 Anna Tamai 
 Naomi Anzai 
 Kaho Sakuma 
 Shiori Mori 
 Konatsu Furukawa 
 Saki Mori
 Yurika Akiyama  
 Yuki Goto
 Mikiho Niwa

References

External links
  
 

Cheerleading films
Films directed by Shō Tsukikawa
Universal Music Japan films
Japanese sports films
2010s Japanese films